The 41st German Skeleton Championship 2007 was organized on 3 March 2007 in Königssee.

Men

Women

See also
 Skeleton (sport)

External links 
 Resultlist at the BSD Site 

Skeleton championships in Germany
2007 in German sport
2007 in skeleton